Cannabis in Bosnia and Herzegovina is illegal.

Polling
In 2016, a survey conducted at the Faculty of Philosophy within Mostar University found that 92% of students supported legalizing cannabis for medical purposes.

Possible legalization of medical cannabis
In 2016 it was announced that the Ministry of Civil Affairs had formed a task force to explore the legalizing of cannabis and cannabinoids for medical purposes.

Cultivation
Following the 1992–1995 Bosnian War, Bosnia became a major producer of cannabis, with much of its output being routed through Slovenia and Croatia due to higher prices there.

References 

 
Bosnia and Herzegovina
Politics of Bosnia and Herzegovina
Drugs in Bosnia and Herzegovina
Society of Bosnia and Herzegovina